Karel Lismont (born 8 March 1949) is a former Belgian long-distance runner. He competed at the 1972, 1976, 1980 and 1984 Olympics in the marathon and 10,000 m events. He won two marathon medals: a silver in 1972 and a bronze in 1976, finishing ninth and twenty-fourth in 1980 and 1984, respectively; he was less successful in the 10,000 m, finishing eleventh in 1976 and failing to reach the final in 1972. His personal best for the marathon was 2:11:12.6 at the 1976 Olympic Games.

Lismont also won one gold and two bronze medals in the marathon at the 1971, and 1978 and 1982 European Championships.  In cross country, he won the bronze medal at the 1978 IAAF World Cross Country Championships.

Lismont won the 1983 Berlin Marathon in 2:13:37. He won the first two Hamburg Marathons in 1986 and 1987, winning in 2:12:12 and 2:13:46, respectively.

Overall, Lismont recorded 10 marathon victories in his career. He has run 3 marathons under 2:12, 18 marathons under 2:15, and 24 marathons under 2:20. He remains the most successful medal-winning Belgian marathoner in international competition as of 2021.

References

1949 births
Living people
People from Borgloon
Olympic athletes of Belgium
Belgian male long-distance runners
Belgian male marathon runners
Athletes (track and field) at the 1972 Summer Olympics
Athletes (track and field) at the 1976 Summer Olympics
Athletes (track and field) at the 1980 Summer Olympics
Athletes (track and field) at the 1984 Summer Olympics
Olympic silver medalists for Belgium
Olympic bronze medalists for Belgium
European Athletics Championships medalists
Medalists at the 1976 Summer Olympics
Medalists at the 1972 Summer Olympics
Sportspeople from Limburg (Belgium)
Berlin Marathon male winners
Olympic silver medalists in athletics (track and field)
Olympic bronze medalists in athletics (track and field)